{{Infobox writer
| name = Karen Lawrence
| birth_name         = 
| image        =
| birth_date   = February 5, 1951
| birth_place  = Windsor, Ontario
| occupation   = novelist, poet
| period       = 1980s-1990s
| nationality  = Canadian
| notableworks = The Life of Helen Alone
| spouse       = 
| website      = 
}}
Karen Lawrence (born February 5, 1951 in Windsor, Ontario) is a Canadian writer, who won the Books in Canada First Novel Award for her 1986 novel The Life of Helen Alone.

Lawrence was educated at the University of Windsor and the University of Alberta. At the time of her award win, she was residing in San Diego, California with her husband.

Her second novel, Springs of Living Water, was published in 1990. In addition to her novels, Lawrence released two poetry collections, and published several short stories in literary magazines.

WorksThe Inanna Poems (1980)The Life of Helen Alone (1986)Springs of Living Water'' (1990)

References

1952 births
Living people
20th-century Canadian novelists
20th-century Canadian poets
Canadian women novelists
Canadian women poets
Canadian women short story writers
Canadian expatriate writers in the United States
Writers from Windsor, Ontario
20th-century Canadian women writers
20th-century Canadian short story writers
Amazon.ca First Novel Award winners